Neoscombrops is a genus of marine ray-finned fishes from the family Acropomatidae, the lanternbellies or glowbellies. The fish in this genus are found in the Atlantic Pacific and Indian Oceans.

Species
The following species are classified within the genus:

 Neoscombrops atlanticus (Mochizuki & Sano, 1984)
 Neoscombrops cynodon (Regan, 1921) (Silver splitfin) 
 Neoscombrops pacificus Mochizuki, 1979

Taxonomy
Neoscombrops was created by the Scottish South African zoologist John Dow Fisher Gilchrist (1866–1926) in 1922 when he described Neoscombrops annectens. However, some authorities merge this genus with Verilus. Fishbase continues to recognise it as a separate genus.

References

 
Acropomatidae